Geschke is a German surname. Notable people with the surname include:

Charles Geschke (1939–2021), American co-founder of Adobe, Inc.
Jürgen Geschke (born 1943), German Olympic track cyclist and father of Simon
Simon Geschke (born 1986), German road cyclist and son of Jürgen

German-language surnames
Surnames from given names
Matronymic surnames